is a collection of three Shinto shrines located in Munakata, Fukuoka Prefecture, Japan. It is the head of the approximately 6,000 Munakata shrines all over the country. Although the name Munakata Taisha refers to all three shrines—Hetsu-gū, Nakatsu-gū and Okitsu-gū—it is commonly used to refer to Hetsu-gū alone.

These kami are believed to be daughters of the goddess Amaterasu, the ancestress of the imperial family or to be the daughters of Susanoo, who has also been worshipped there for many years as the god of mariners, and he has come to be worshipped as the god of traffic safety on land as well.

Munakata Taisha is also home to many Japanese treasures. Hetsu-gū's honden (main shrine) and haiden (main prayer hall) are both designated Important Cultural Properties and the precincts are a Historic Site. The , the shrine's treasure hall located on the southwest corner of Hetsu-gū's grounds, houses many important relics including six National Treasures of Japan. Over 120,000 artifacts housed in the Shinpō-kan were unearthed on Okinoshima.

It was formerly an imperial shrine of the first rank (官幣大社, kanpei taisha) in the Modern system of ranked Shinto Shrines.

Three shrines

All three shrines are located in Fukuoka Prefecture, yet they are all on separate islands. The main shrine, Hetsu-gū, is located on the mainland of Kyūshū. Nakatsu-gū is established at the foot of Mt. Mitake on the island of Ōshima off the west coast of Kyūshū. The final shrine, Okitsu-gū, is on the island of Okinoshima located in the middle of the Genkai Sea. The shrine occupies the entire island, therefore women are not allowed to set foot on the island and men must perform a purification ceremony before landing.

In 2009 the three shrines were submitted for future inscription on the UNESCO World Heritage List as part of the serial nomination Okinoshima Island and Related Sites in Munakata Region.

In July, 2017 Japan's Okinoshima Island gained UNESCO World Heritage Status.

See also
Munakata Saikaku
List of Shinto shrines
List of National Treasures of Japan (archaeological materials)
World Heritage Sites in Japan
Beppyo shrines

References

Shinto shrines in Fukuoka Prefecture
Munakata, Fukuoka
National Treasures of Japan
Important Cultural Properties of Japan
Historic Sites of Japan
Kanpei-taisha